Monotron (stylised as monotron in all lowercase) is the collective name of a series of miniature analogue synthesizers produced by Korg, a Japanese manufacturer of electronic musical instruments. There are three models in the series: the original Monotron, the Monotron Duo and the Monotron Delay.

Monotron 

Announced in the summer of 2010 at Musikmesse, the Monotron was Korg's first analogue synthesizer in two decades (the last design being the Trident mkII). It has a continuous ribbon controller for pitch and gate. The ribbon controller is also connected to the filter cutoff. There are five knobs for changing parameters. The synthesizer was designed by Tatsuya Takahashi.

The small form factor and analogue circuitry made some draw parallels between the Monotron and the Stylophone, a miniature analogue electronic keyboard musical instrument invented in 1967 by Brian Jarvis — British consumer electronics magazine Stuff called the Monotron "the new Stylophone" following its release.

Monotron has a voltage-controlled oscillator (VCO), voltage-controlled filter (VCF), a simple gated voltage-controlled amplifier (VCA) and a low-frequency oscillator (LFO). The VCO and LFO both use a sawtooth waveform. The Monotron's VCO has control over pitch and can reach frequencies below human hearing. The LFO has control over a range of <1 Hz to 900 Hz and can be routed to pitch or filter cutoff, with control over intensity. The VCF is the same design as the Korg-25 filter chip that used on the MS-10 and MS-20 synthesizers. It has control over cutoff and resonance. External connections on the Monotron consist of a headphone output and an audio input.

Monotron Duo 

The Monotron Duo was announced in November 2011. It was exhibited at the NAMM show. It shares the same base design as the original Monotron but is instead coloured blue. Like other models, the Monotron Duo has a ribbon controller (with a range of one octave). The ribbon controller has four playing modes: chromatic, major, minor and unquantised. Monotron Duo has an automatic tuning system to ensure tuning stability.

The Monotron Duo loses the LFO of the original and replaces it with an extra VCO and a cross-modulation circuit. The dual VCOs use square waveforms and have a range of four octaves. VCO2's frequency is dependent on VCO1 so it can be set to play in intervals. The cross-modulation circuit (named "X-mod" by Korg)  is similar to the one found on Korg's Mono/Poly synthesizer. The 12 db/octave MS-20 filter is also present on the Monotron Duo with control over cutoff and resonance.

Monotron Delay 

Announced alongside the Monotron Duo, the Monotron Delay has a design more similar to the original. Its faceplate is black and orange, with additional writing done in UV paint.

The Delay's ribbon controller is unquantised and spans four octaves. Its markings- ostensibly representing a keyboard little over an octave in size- are purely decorative and do not correspond to the pitch output nor the ribbon's actual range.

The sound engine of the Monotron Delay includes a single VCO, an LFO, VCF and a delay circuit. The VCO uses a sawtooth waveform. The VCF is the same as the other Monotrons but only has control over cutoff. The LFO is connected to oscillator pitch and can be a triangle (blendable between sawtooth and ramp) or pulse (with PWM) waveform. The delay circuit is based on the PT2399 echo processor chip and has control over time and feedback. Maximum delay times are around one second. The delay will self oscillate at high feedback levels.

Modifications 

Due to their accessibility, the Monotron series became very popular candidates for modifications. Part of this popularity comes from Korg's decision to release the Monotrons' schematics online as well as labeling relevant solder points on the PCB.

Due to the lack of external connections on the Monotrons (apart from audio in/out), the most popular modifications add control voltage (CV) or MIDI capabilities to control the synthesizer from other hardware. Mods adding MIDI support use microcontrollers such as the Raspberry Pi or an Atmel ATmega328P.

Other modifications can be more extreme, like the "FrankenSynth". Nicknamed by the digital music resource site Ask.Audio, it is a heavily expanded Monotron designed in the United Kingdom by Harry Axten. Carrying out any modifications on a Monotron voids the synthesizer's warranty.

References 

Korg synthesizers
Japanese musical instruments